Giovanni Sommaripa (died 1468) was the lord of Andros island from 1466 until his death in battle against the Ottomans in 1468. He was a son of Domenico Sommaripa. He was succeeded by his brother, Crusino II Sommaripa.

References

Sources
 
 

1468 deaths
Giovanni
Giovanni
People killed in action